The 1951-52 Oberliga season was the fourth season of the Oberliga, the top level of ice hockey in Germany. Eight teams participated in the league, and Krefelder EV won the championship.

First round

North

South

3rd place
 EC Bad Tölz – EV Rosenheim 6:3

Final round

Final 
 Krefelder EV – SC Riessersee 6:4 (2:2, 1:1, 3:1)

Relegation

South
 EV Rosenheim – TEV Miesbach 8:2

References

Oberliga (ice hockey) seasons
West
Ger